The Sumatra toad (Duttaphrynus sumatranus) is a species of toad endemic to Sumatra, Indonesia, and only known from Lubuk Selasi. It has been found along a small, clear stream in secondary forest. It is locally common but listed as a critically endangered species due to a restricted range and continuing habitat loss (conversion of habitat into rice paddies, causing siltation of streams).

References 

sumatranus
Amphibians of Indonesia
Endemic fauna of Indonesia
Fauna of Sumatra
Amphibians described in 1871
Taxa named by Wilhelm Peters